Josué Cruz Jr. is an educator, professor, and current Dean of the School Education at Bowling Green University.  Cruz, a supporter of early childhood education, was appointed President of the National Association for the Education of Young Children in 2005.

References

1946 births
Living people
American educators
Bowling Green State University faculty